Hydrops may refer to:

Medicine
 Hydrops, the excessive accumulation of serous fluid in tissues or cavities of the body, corresponding to any of various conditions, depending on characteristics and anatomic site, including: 
 Most generally 
 Edema (hydropsy, dropsy) 
 Anasarca, a severe and widespread form of edema 
 Ascites, fluid buildup in the abdomen 
 Effusion (medical senses)—see Effusion (disambiguation) 
 More specifically 
 Endolymphatic hydrops, edema in the inner ear, present in Ménière's disease
 Cochlear hydrops, a variant of Meniere's disease/Endolymphatic Hydrops without vertigo. 
 Hydrops fetalis, edema in a fetus
 Corneal hydrops, humoral edema of the eye

Zoology
 Hydrops (snake), a dipsadid snake genus